Grevillea cagiana, commonly known as red toothbrushes, is a species of flowering plant in the family Proteaceae and is endemic to the south-west of Western Australia. It is an erect or spreading shrub with simple or divided leaves with linear lobes, and green, yellow, orange or pink flowers with red styles.

Description

Taxonomy
Grevillea cagiana was first formally described in 1986 by Donald McGillivray in his book New Names in Grevillea (Proteaceae), based on specimens collected near Kukerin in 1976. The specific epithet (cagiana) honours Charles Austin Gardner, from his initials "C.A.G.".

Distribution and habitat
This grevillea grows in heathland and shrubland between Merredin, Coolgardie and the Bremer Range in the Avon Wheatbelt, Coolgardie, Esperance Plains and Mallee biogeographic regions of south-western Western Australia.

Conservation status
Grevillea cagiana is listed as "not threatened" by the Government of Western Australia Department of Biodiversity, Conservation and Attractions.

References

External links
Herbarium specimen at Royal Botanic Gardens Kew

cagiana
Proteales of Australia
Flora of Western Australia
Taxa named by Donald McGillivray
Plants described in 1986